Khurzan (also Romanized as Khūrzān; also known as Khowzrān) is a [[village]] in Qohab-e Rastaq Rural District, Amirabad District, Damghan County, Semnan Province, Iran. At the 2006 census, its population was 398, in 106 families.

References 

Populated places in Damghan County